Paul Stråhlman (23 December 1928 – 25 June 1990) was a Finnish rower. He competed in the men's coxed four event at the 1952 Summer Olympics.

References

External links
 

1928 births
1990 deaths
Finnish male rowers
Olympic rowers of Finland
Rowers at the 1952 Summer Olympics
Sportspeople from Uusimaa